Londesborough railway station was a station on the York to Beverley Line in the East Riding of Yorkshire, England. It opened on 4 October 1847 and served the villages of Shiptonthorpe and Londesborough. The station was originally named Shipton & Londesborough, was renamed to Shipton in April 1864 and became Londesborough in January 1867. It closed after the last train ran on 27 November 1965.

References

External links
 Londesborough station on navigable 1947 O. S. map
 

Disused railway stations in the East Riding of Yorkshire
Former York and North Midland Railway stations
Beeching closures in England
Railway stations in Great Britain opened in 1847
Railway stations in Great Britain closed in 1965
1847 establishments in England
George Townsend Andrews railway stations